Śmierć jak kromka chleba is a Polish historical film about pacification of Wujek. It was released in 1994.

References

External links
 

1994 films
Polish historical films
1990s Polish-language films
1990s historical films